Limnodrilus is a genus of Naididae.

The genus was described in 1862 by René-Édouard Claparède.

It has cosmopolitan distribution.

Species:
 Limnodrilus amblysetus (Brinkhurst, Qi & Liang, 1990)
 Limnodrilus bogdanowii (Grimm, 1876)
 Limnodrilus bulbiphallus (Block & Goodnight, 1972)
 Limnodrilus cervix (Brinkhurst, 1963)
 Limnodrilus claparedianus (Ratzel, 1868)
 Limnodrilus dybowskii (Grube, 1873)
 Limnodrilus grandisetosus (Nomura, 1932)
 Limnodrilus hoffmeisteri (Claparède, 1862)
 Limnodrilus maumeensis (Brinkhurst & Cook, 1966)
 Limnodrilus neotropicus (Černosvitov, 1939)
 Limnodrilus nitens (Semernoy, 1982)
 Limnodrilus paramblysetus (Wang & Liang, 2001)
 Limnodrilus profundicola (Verrill, 1871)
 Limnodrilus rubripenis (Loden, 1977)
 Limnodrilus silvani (Eisen, 1879)
 Limnodrilus simplex (He, Cui & Wang, 2010)
 Limnodrilus sulphurensis (Fend, Liu & Erséus, 2016)
 Limnodrilus tendens (Semernoy, 1982)
 Limnodrilus tortilipenis (Wetzel, 1987)
 Limnodrilus udekemianus (Claparède, 1862)

References

Naididae
Annelid genera